The 2011 South American Cross Country Championships took place on February 20, 2011.  The races were held at the Club Deportivo Sajonia in Asunción, Paraguay.  A detailed report of the event was given for the IAAF.

Complete results and results for junior and youth competitions were published.

Medallists

Race results

Senior men's race (12 km)

Note: Athletes in parentheses did not score for the team result.

Junior (U20) men's race (8 km)

Note: Athletes in parentheses did not score for the team result.

Youth (U18) men's race (4 km)

Note: Athletes in parentheses did not score for the team result.

Senior women's race (8 km)

Note: Athletes in parentheses did not score for the team result.

Junior (U20) women's race (6 km)

Note: Athletes in parentheses did not score for the team result.

Youth (U18) women's race (3 km)

Note: Athletes in parentheses did not score for the team result.

Medal table (unofficial)

Note: Totals include both individual and team medals, with medals in the team competition counting as one medal.

Participation
According to an unofficial count, 97 athletes from 10 countries participated.

 (15)
 (1)
 (21)
 (7)
 (7)
 (6)
 (18)
 Perú (12)
 (8)
 (2)

See also
 2011 in athletics (track and field)

References

South American Cross Country Championships
South American Cross Country Championships
South American Cross Country Championships
International athletics competitions hosted by Paraguay
Cross country running in Paraguay
February 2011 sports events in South America